The Monroes were a Norwegian pop/ska duo, consisting of singer Lage Fosheim and guitarist Eivind Rølles. They recorded four successful studio albums between 1983 and 1993, before disbanding. Initially strongly influenced by English ska band Madness, their debut single "Sunday People" reached number one on the Norwegian charts in 1983. Their music rapidly evolved into a more laidback, melodious pop style, and they reached number one again with "Cheerio" in 1985, also charting in the U.S. Their 1985 album "Face Another Day" is regularly featured on critics' lists of Norway's best pop/rock albums ever.

The Monroes were noted for their strong melodies, polished musical arrangements, and Lage Fosheim's clear vocals and distinctly British-sounding accent.

Both members died of cancer in 2013.

History 
The Monroes were formed in 1982 by Rølles and Fosheim after having disbanded their band "Broadway News", a popular act on the club scene in Oslo in the late 70s. Fosheim and Rølles then decided to remain a duo in order to retain creative control. Their eponymous 1983 debut album "Sunday People" was heavily influenced by English ska act Madness, as clearly demonstrated by their debut single, "Sunday People". The album sold over 130.000 copies, earning them a platinum disc, and "Sunday People" went to number one on the VG-Lista topp 20 singles chart.

Their 1985 follow-up "Face Another Day" eschewed the ska beats for a more laid-back pop sound, and sold over 250.000 copies in Norway alone, earning them double platinum and another number one single, "Cheerio". They also gained international success and made the top 10 on the U.S. pop singles chart.

Their third studio album, "Everything's Forgiven" was released in 1987 to general acclaim and sold well, despite not matching huge success of its predecessors. Their fourth, and final album "The Long Way Home" was released in 1993 and the duo disbanded shortly thereafter. In the next ten years they held sporadic reunion concerts, but did not record any new material.

In 2004, the pop-rap duo Ravi & DJ Løv released the song "Tsjeriåu" (the name is a sort of Norwegian, phonetic representation of the English word "cheerio"), featuring the chorus from "Cheerio" with Lage Fosheim on re-recorded vocals. This brought something of a renaissance for the Monroes, who reunited for a tour of Norway and also played the festival circuit for the next year and a half. They disbanded again in 2006, still not having produced any new material.

In 2008, Rølles was diagnosed with cancer, but continued to work behind the scenes in the music industry. In 2012, Fosheim was also diagnosed with cancer. Both died during 2013, Rølles on 18 March (aged 54), and Fosheim on 19 October (aged 55).

Members 
 Lage Fosheim - vocals (1982-1993, 2004-2005)
 Eivind Rølles - guitars (1982-1993, 2004-2005)

Discography

Studio albums

Compilation albums

Singles

References

External links
 The Monroes i NRK Artist

Second-wave ska groups
Norwegian ska groups
Norwegian pop music groups
Norwegian musical duos
Musical groups from Oslo
Musical groups established in 1982
1982 establishments in Norway
Musical groups disestablished in 2005
Musical groups from Norway with local place of origin missing